Robert Davidson (born 25 March 1986 in Rutherglen) is a Scottish footballer.

Davidson started his career at Rangers, and after progressing through the Ibrox side's youth ranks alongside Ross McCormack, he made his debut against Dunfermline on 16 May 2004 as part of an experimental team fielded by manager Alex McLeish at the end of the season. He made one other appearance, against Inverness Caledonian Thistle in a 1–1 draw in season 2004–05.

He was loaned to Boston United in England at the start of the 2006–07 season, returning to Rangers in January. However, at the behest of new manager Walter Smith he was allowed to leave on a free transfer, joining Dundee in January 2007. Davidson failed to have his contract renewed when it expired in 2009.

Davidson made two appearances as a trialist for Clyde in the Second Division during the 2009/10 season. He then moved into junior football with Lanark United. In 2015 he signed for Cambuslang Rangers.

References

External links 

1986 births
Living people
Sportspeople from Rutherglen
People educated at Stonelaw High School
Scottish footballers
Scottish Premier League players
Scottish Football League players
English Football League players
Rangers F.C. players
Boston United F.C. players
Dundee F.C. players
Clyde F.C. players
Association football forwards
Scottish Junior Football Association players
Cambuslang Rangers F.C. players
Lanark United F.C. players
Footballers from South Lanarkshire